María Belén Benítez González (born 18 December 1995), known as Belén Benítez, is a Paraguayan footballer who plays as a defender. She has been a member of the Paraguay women's national team.

International career
Benítez represented Paraguay at the 2014 FIFA U-20 Women's World Cup. At senior level, she played the 2014 Copa América Femenina.

References

External links

1995 births
Living people
Women's association football defenders
Paraguayan women's footballers
Sportspeople from Asunción
Paraguay women's international footballers